Erigeron bonariensis is a species of Erigeron, found throughout the tropics and subtropics as a pioneer plant; its precise origin is unknown, but most likely it stems from Central America or South America. It has become naturalized in many other regions, including North America, Europe and Australia.

Names

Common names include flax-leaf fleabane, wavy-leaf fleabane, Argentine fleabane, hairy horseweed, asthma weed and hairy fleabane.

Description
Its flower heads have white ray florets and yellow disc florets. It can easily be confused with Erigeron canadensis, which grows taller, and E. sumatrensis.

It flowers in August and continues fruiting until the first frosts. It is instantly recognisable by its blue-green foliage, very narrow, undulate stem-leaves, and purple-tipped involucral bracts. It reproduces only by seed, which are easily blown and spread by wind.

Habitat
Erigeron bonariensis is a rare alien in southeastern England, found along walls and in cracks in pavements and concrete driveways. It is widespread throughout Australia, where it thrives on roadsides, fallows, pastures, gardens, lawns, footpaths, parks, riparian vegetation, forest and wetland perimeters, waste dumps and disturbed grounds.

References

bonariensis
Flora of South America
Plants described in 1753
Taxa named by Carl Linnaeus